The year 1683 in science and technology involved some significant events.

Geography
 Vincenzo Coronelli completes terrestrial and celestial globes for Louis XIV of France.

Biology
 September 17 – Antonie van Leeuwenhoek writes a letter to the Royal Society of London describing "animalcules" – the first known description of protozoa.

Mathematics
 Based on his discovery of the resultant, Seki Takakazu starts to develop elimination theory in the Kai-fukudai-no-hō (解伏題之法,); and to express the resultant, he develops the notion of the determinant.
 Jacob Bernoulli discovers the mathematical constant e.

Medicine
 Dutch physician Willem ten Rhijne publishes Dissertatio de Arthritide: Mantissa Schematica: De Acupunctura in London, introducing the West to acupuncture and moxibustion.

Technology
 Vauban's manual on fortification, Le Directeur-Général des fortifications, begins publication at The Hague.

Institutions
 May 24 – The Ashmolean Museum opens in Broad Street, Oxford (England) as the world's first purpose-built university museum, including accommodation for the teaching of natural philosophy and a chemistry laboratory. Naturalist Dr. Robert Plot is the first keeper and first professor of chemistry.
 October 15 – First meeting of the Dublin Philosophical Society, established by William Molyneux.

Births
 February 28 – Rene Antoine Ferchault de Reaumur, French physicist (died 1757)
 December 23 – François Nicole, French mathematician (died 1758)
 Approximate date
 Giovanni Poleni, Italian mathematician and physicist (died 1761)
 Edmund Weaver, English astronomer (died 1748)

Deaths
 May 2 – Stjepan Gradić, Ragusan polymath (born 1613)
 November 10
 John Collins, English mathematician (born 1625)
 Robert Morison, Scottish botanist (born 1620)

References

 
17th century in science
1680s in science